Malika El Maslouhi (born 9 January 1999) is an Italian fashion model, of Moroccan and Italian descent.

Early life 
El Maslouhi was born in Milan on 9 January 1999 to a Moroccan father and an Italian mother.  The family speaks two languages at home in Niguarda, Milan.

Career 
El Maslouhi began modeling at age 18, upon which a friend of her mother connected her with an Italian casting director. She was signed by VIVA Model Management in Milan. Her debut fashion show was walking for Alberta Ferretti during the A/W 2019 season. Having been cast in the Dior show that took place in Marrakech, Morocco, and the Jacquemus show in Provence, the French Riviera, she decided to end her college studies and model full time. Other brands she has walked for include Chanel, Tommy Hilfiger, Vera Wang, Missoni, Ralph Lauren, The Row, and she has appeared in campaigns for Lanvin, Calvin Klein Underwear, Anthropologie, and Zara.

El Maslouhi has appeared on the cover of Vogue Arabia and Elle France. In editorials, she has appeared in T: The New York Times Style Magazine, The Sunday Times, Vogue Italia, British Vogue, and Dazed. Vogue described her as "beauty fit for a Fellini film," when they chose her as one of the "Top 15 Models of Spring 2020". Models.com also chose her as one of the Top Newcomers in the Breakout category for the 2020 season.

References 

Living people
1999 births
Italian female models
Italian people of Moroccan descent
Moroccan people of Italian descent
Moroccan female models
Models from Milan